Qaleh Now-e Khaleseh may refer to:
 Qaleh Now-e Khaleseh, Razavi Khorasan
 Qaleh Now-e Khaleseh, Semnan
 Qaleh Now-e Khaleseh, Tehran